This is a list of curling clubs in Norway:

Bergen Curling Club - Bergen
Brumunddal Curlingklubb - Brumunddal
Bygdøy Curling Club - Oslo
Bærum Curling Club - Oslo
Christiansands Curling Club - Kristiansand
Danmarksplasse Herre- og Kvinnecurling - Danmarksplass
Furumo Curling Klubb - Geithus
Halden Curling Club - Halden
Hamar Curlingklubb - Hamar
Larvik Curlingklubb - Larvik
Lilleborg IK, Curlinggruppe - Eiksmarka
Lillehammer Curlingklubb - Lillehammer
Lørenskog Curlingklubb - Lørenskog
Nærbø IL, Curling - Nærbø
Oppdal Curlingklubb - Oppdal
Oslo Curlingklubb - Lillestrøm
Oslo Damecurling - Oslo
Risenga Curlingklubb - Vettre
Sarpsborg Curlingklubb - Sarpsborg
Scheen Curling Klubb - Skien
Snarøen Curling Club - Snarøya
Stabekk Curlingklubb - Jar
Toten CK - Bøverbru
Trondheim Curlingklubb - Trondheim
Vestkanten Curlingklubb - Bergen
Øvre Holen Curlingforening - Laksevåg

Norway
Clubs
Curling